The Uganda women's cricket team toured Nepal in May 2022 to play a five-match bilateral Women's Twenty20 International (WT20I) series. All of the matches in the series were played at the Tribhuvan University International Cricket Ground in Kirtipur. These were the first Women's T20I matches played at Kirtipur. The series was used by Uganda as preparation for the 2022 Kwibuka Tournament.

Uganda won the first three matches, to win the series with two games to spare. Nepal won the fourth match of the series by 15 runs, and the fifth match by 33 runs, with Uganda winning the series 3–2.

Squads

WT20I series

1st WT20I

2nd WT20I

3rd WT20I

4th WT20I

5th WT20I

References

External links
 Series home at ESPN Cricinfo

2022 in Nepalese cricket
Associate international cricket competitions in 2022